La-Chun Lindsay is an American aerospace engineer who was the Managing Director of Wales' largest industrial company, GE Aviation Wales. She was the first woman to hold this position and she campaigned for LGBT rights in Wales.

Early life and education 
Lindsay was born in the city of Rock Hill in South Carolina. She went to school there and graduated from Clemson University in 1995, with a B.S in Ceramic Engineering. From January 1992 to August 1994 she worked as a cooperative education student for the Department of Energy at Battelle Laboratory. She developed a "fiber optic coupled system for use in the remote processing of nuclear waste". She also "invented a system to destroy fluorocarbons and halohydrocarbons by reaction with molten aluminum".

Career 
After graduating she worked at SELEE Corporation, where she introduced the use of ceramic foam in metal filtration technology. At SELEE, she occupied numerous different roles and led their largest product line. She then joined General Electric Quartz in 1997 as plant manager. Lindsay held a number of roles at General Electric, including Process Engineer, Tubing Green Belt, Supplier Quality Black Belt and Manager of the Sand Processing Plant, before joining the Corporate Audit Staff in 2000. Here, she performed financial, compliance, regulatory and commercial audits, and she was a member of GE's Commercial Council. 

In 2007, she became Vice President of Commercial Distribution Finances Field Services Group in GE Capital where she led over 300 remote employees. In 2014, she transitioned to GE Aviation as Plant Leader of Lynn Assembly, Test and Overhaul, where her team grew to over 400, and she was responsible for producing and developing engines for GE Aviation’s military and commercial customers.

In 2015, she became Managing Director for GE Aviation Wales, a company with approximately $3 billion in annual revenues. During Lindsay's leadership, GE Aviation Wales was awarded the contract to service the GE9X jet engine, requiring a £20 million investment in the site, with £5 million pledged by the Welsh Government. Lindsay was a guest speaker at the "Women in the Workplace" event which was held in conjunction with the UEFA Women's Champions League final in Cardiff. Lindsay moved back to the United States to work at the GE Aviation headquarters in 2018.

Awards 

 2017 - Honorary Fellow at Cardiff University
 2017 - Honorary Doctorate at the University of South Wales
 2018 - Honorary degree, College of Engineering, Swansea University

Diversity efforts 
In 2016, it was claimed that Lindsay was the only openly gay executive within the global company of General Electric. During her first two years at GE Aviation Wales, the number of women on the shop floor rose from 1 to 13%. She founded the Wales branch of the GLBTA GE Aviation Alliance, which was developed to attract, develop, and retain gay, lesbian, bisexual, and transgender employees within the company. Since launching GE’s first LGBTQ+ Chapter in Wales it has grown to GE’s largest LGBTQ+ Chapter in the UK. Lindsay was ranked number four in the Wales Online ‘Pinc List 2016: The 40 most influential LGBT people in Wales’ for her work in this field.

References 

Living people
People from Rock Hill, South Carolina
American aerospace engineers
Clemson University alumni
American LGBT scientists
Year of birth missing (living people)